The 2022 British Supersport Championship season was the 34th British Supersport Championship season, incorporating the 2022 British GP2 Cup. Jack Kennedy started the season as the reigning champion.

Teams and riders

Race calendar and results

Championship standings
Scoring system
Points are awarded to the top fifteen finishers in the respective classes. A rider has to finish the race to earn points.

Supersport Championship

GP2 Cup

References 

British Supersport
Supersport
British Supersport Championship